The Notch may refer to:

Military
 The Post-Attack Command and Control System Facility, Hadley, Massachusetts, United States (historic).

Places
 The Notch (Longs Peak), a rock gap on Longs Peak, Colorado, United States.
 The Notch (Rock Mountain), a mountain pass in the San Juan Mountains of Colorado, United States.
 The Notch (Madison County, Montana), a mountain pass in Madison County, Montana, United States.
 The Notch (San Juan County, Utah), a mountain pass in San Juan County, Utah, United States.
 The Notch (Summit County, Utah), a mountain pass in Summit County, Utah, United States.

See also